Kord Sara Kuh may refer to:
 Kord Sara Kuh-e Bala
 Kord Sara Kuh-e Pain